Umberto Marigliani (1885–1960) was an Italian painter, active in Northern Italy, painting sacred subjects.

Biography
He trained under Cesare Tallone and Ponziano Loverini at the Accademia Carrara, then at the Scuola d’arte Andrea Fantoni. He then worked under Fermo Taragni. In 1907, he helped fresco the ceiling of the church of Sant’Antonio Abbandonato, near Val Brembilla.

Nicknamed Tiepolino for his rapid fresco execution, he was active in Liguria and Switzerland. He helped found in 1913 the Società degli acquafortisti bergamaschi, and in  1938 made designs for the windows of the Sanctuary of Pompei. He also painted for the church of San Vittore, Calcio.

References

20th-century Italian painters
Italian male painters
Painters from Bergamo
1885 births
1960 deaths
20th-century Italian male artists